Peter Bennett (c. 1928 – September 6, 1993) was a Canadian football player who played for the Toronto Argonauts, Hamilton Tiger-Cats. He won the Grey Cup with Toronto in 1950 and 1952. Bennett previously played junior football for the Junior Toronto Balmy Beach Beachers and attended the University of Toronto. He died in 1993 after a heart attack.

References

1928 births
1993 deaths
Hamilton Tiger-Cats players
Canadian football people from Toronto
Toronto Argonauts players
University of Toronto alumni
Players of Canadian football from Ontario